Marquess of Lavradio is a Portuguese title of nobility created by Letters Patent of King José I of Portugal on 18 October 1753 for D. António de Almeida Soares de Portugal, 1st Count of Lavradio and 4th Count of Avintes.

Titles and Honours
The first Marquess of Lavradio was a prominent statesman and the head of an established noble family. In his own right, he was the 4th Count of Avintes, and 8th Lord of Avintes, also Portuguese titles of nobility. In gratitude for the exceptional services to his country of his uncle D. Tomás de Almeida, 1st Cardinal Patriarch of Lisbon, on 12 January 1714 King John V of Portugal conferred on him the Seigniory of Lavradio, and the title of Count of Lavradio, in perpetuity, confirmed by Letters Patent of 4 June 1725, as well as adding to his commanderies in the Order of Christ. The first Marquess held key administrative positions under kings João V of Portugal and José I of Portugal, notably as 38th Governor General of Angola, from 1748 to 1753, in recognition of which he was elevated to the marquessate, and, albeit briefly, as 8th Viceroy of Brazil in 1760. He married D. Francisca das Chagas Mascarenhas, daughter of D. Martinho Mascarenhas, 3rd Marquess of Gouvêa and 6th Count of Santa Cruz, and his wife. D. Maria Rosa de Távora. She died six years later in childbirth, having borne five children.
Their eldest son, the 2nd Marquess and 11th Viceroy of Brasil, like his father, was arguably one of the most remarkable and respected colonial administrators in Brasil. Having followed a successful army career, becoming colonel of the Cascais Regiment and rising to the rank of Brigadier during the war of 1762, he was given the governorship of the province of Bahia   and was soon after promoted to Governor General of Rio de Janeiro and Viceroy of Brasil. He had 12 children by his wife, D. Maria Ana da Cunha, daughter of the 5th Counts of São Vicente.The 3rd Marquess of Lavradio, as well as inheriting the assets that were not confiscated by the Crown from his great-uncle, the 8th Duke of Aveiro, was granted the hereditary distinction of Honras de Parente d'El Rei by Letters Patent of 1 June 1810, upon his becoming head of the two extant Lancastre lineages: one a legitimate bloodline of the Royal House of Aviz, who were Comendadores-mores of the Order of Christ; the other of the Dukes of Aveiro, descended from the illegitimate and only surviving son of King João II, D. Jorge, Duke of Coimbra.

In addition to holding the titles of Count of Avintes, Count of Lavradio and Count of Torres Vedras, the Marquesses of Lavradio are Chiefs of the Name and Arms of the Lancastre, Mascarenhas and Alarcão lineages in Portugal, and head of the noble houses of Aveiro, Gouvêa, Portalegre, Santa Cruz, Montalvão and Turcifal, and thus claimants to the titles of Duque of Aveiro, Duque and Marquess of Torres Novas, Marquess of Gouvêa, Marquess of Montalvão, Count of Portalegre, Count of Santa Cruz, Count of Castelo Novo and Count of Serém. They also represent the curious title of Marquess of Turcifal, a Portuguese title of nobility given to the 3rd Count of Torres Vedras by Felipe IV of Spain in 1652, during the Portuguese War of Independence.

The lengthy surname used by the Marquesses of Lavradio underlines their position as Chiefs of various lineages, as well as their legal obligation as administrators of various morgadios, many of which inherited by marriage and subject to the use of the founder's surname. In fact, in addition to the successive honours and positions earned by the House of Lavradio through continuous service of the family to the Crown, its patrimony would extend to all regions of Portugal, except the Algarve, covering a significant part of Portuguese territory by way of marriage alliances.

The title of Count of Avintes, which was granted to the 4th Count and his descendants in perpetuity, is assumed at birth by the eldest son and heir of the Marquess of Lavradio. The title of Count of Lavradio has been used on four more occasions by younger sons and close relatives of the head of the family with the latter's permission.

Origins and Family History
The Marquesses of Lavradio are chiefs of one of the branches of the Almeida family of Portugal, whose noble origins and genealogy are described in detail in all Portuguese nobiliaries, notably "História Genealógica da Casa Real Portuguesa" and "Memórias Históricas e Genealógicas dos Grandes de Portugal", both by D. António Caetano de Sousa, and "Brasões da Sala de Sintra", by Anselmo Braamcamp Freire.

Almeida family origins 
Given the family's antiquity, its elevated status and influence on Portugal's history, and the scarcity of reliable documentary proof until the late 14th century, genealogists have traced a number of possible ascendencies for the Almeidas.  In his Chronica de Cister, Friar Bernardo de Brito, later copied by many respected genealogists, traces the Almeidas to Pelayo Amado, a 12th-century nobleman, whose grandson, Payo Guterres, took the castle of Almeida from the Moors, gaining the nickname "O Almeidão". Braamcamp Freire, however, suggests Fernão Canelas, owner of the estates of Pinheiro and Canelas near Mangualde in the latter part of the 12th century, as a more probable instigator of this lineage. His son, João Fernandes, founded the village of Almeida, from where he took his surname. Manuel Abranches Soveral picks up on the similarities described by Braamcamp Freire of the Almeida coat of arms to that of the Mello family, whose ascendency is well documented, and suggests a likely alliance by marriage early in the 13th century.

The Counts of Abrantes 
By the end of the 14th century, the Almeida clan had established itself amongst the highest levels of Portuguese nobility largely as a result of their proximity to King John I, a relationship with the royal family that would endure for centuries. Fernão Álvares de Almeida, a knight of the Order of Aviz and its Claveiro, who held two important commanderies in the order, sat on the Royal Council of King João I and was his Vedor da Fazenda and tutor to his children, the Infantes. In 1400 he was named Governor of Abrantes. His son, Diogo Fernandes de Almeida, was King Duarte's Vedor da Fazenda and as Reposteiro-mor, one of the most senior Court officials. He became Governor of Abrantes, following the death of his father, and was granted the Seigniory of Sardoal. He married D. Brites Anes, granddaughter of Prince João of Portugal, Duke of Valencia de Campos. Their son, D. Lopo de Almeida, fourth cousin to King Afonso V, was created Count of Abrantes by Royal Decree of 13 June 1476.

The 1st Count of Abrantes married D. Brites da Silva, lady-in-waiting to Queen Leonor. They had an illustrious progeny, which included:
 D. João de Almeida (d.1512), 2nd Count of Abrantes, adviser to King João II and his Guarda-mor;
 D. Diogo Fernandes de Almeida, Governor of Torres Novas, Monteiro-mor and 6th Prior of Crato;
 D. Jorge de Almeida, Bishop of Coimbra and 2nd Count of Arganil;
 D. Pedro da Silva, who took his mother's surname, Comendador-mor of the Order of Aviz and one of King João II's ambassadors to Rome;
 D. Fernando de Almeida, Bishop of Ceuta. Was Pope Alexander VI's Apostolic Nuncio to France and was appointed Bishop of Nevers;
 D. Francisco de Almeida, 1st Viceroy of India.

The Lavradio Palace 
One of the family's morgadios was instituted by D. Ana Henriques on 21 July 1587 for her nephew, D. Luis de Almeida, grandfather to the future 1st Count of Avintes. D. Ana was the daughter of D. Lopo de Almeida, Captain General of Sofala, and granddaughter of D. Diogo Fernandes de Almeida, Prior of Crato. She did not marry and died childless. This morgadio encompassed a number of assets, including buildings and land in the Campo de Santa Clara adjacent, or formerly belonging to the Infanta D. Maria, daughter of King Manuel I. The Almeida family had already established its base in the city in the Campo de Santa de Santa Clara by 1619, and it would be a great-great-grandson of D. Luis de Almeida, 1st administrator of the Morgadio of Santa Clara, who would effect the changes that are still visible today.

D. Tomás de Almeida, first Cardinal Patriarch of Lisbon, acquired the land from his brother, the 3rd Count of Avintes, razing the existing buildings and building a sumptuous 18th century palace, which he then presented to his nephew, D. António de Almeida Soares de Portugal, 4th Count of Avintes and later 8th Viceroy of Brasil and 1st Marquis of Lavradio. The palace was built by German architect João Frederico Ludovice, with construction beginning in 1745. Its architecture is unique in that its focal point is a central and rigorously symmetrical staircase, from which the rest of the building extends. It serves as one of only a few examples of civic baroque architecture during Portugal's Johannine period. Despite the scale of the earthquake experienced by Lisbon in 1755, which destroyed a large part of the city, the Lavradio Palace was virtually untouched.

The palace would continue to be the seat of the Marquesses of Lavradio in Lisbon until 1875, when it was acquired by the State to be used as Portugal's military courts of justice.

Marquesses of Lavradio (1753)

 D. António de Almeida Soares de Portugal (1701—1760), 1st Marquess and 1st Count of Lavradio, 4th Count of Avintes, 8th Viceroy of Brasil. Succeeded by his son
 D. Luís de Almeida Portugal Soares de Alarcão d'Eça e Mello Silva Mascarenhas (1729—1790), 2nd Marquess of Lavradio, 5th Count of Avintes, 11th Viceroy of Brasil. Succeeded by his son
 D. António Máximo de Almeida Portugal Soares de Alarcão Mello de Castro Ataíde d'Eça Mascarenhas Silva e Lancastre (1756—1833), 3rd Marquess of Lavradio, 6th Count of Avintes. Succeeded by his son
 D. Luís de Almeida Portugal Soares de Alarcão Mello de Castro Ataíde d'Eça Mascarenhas Silva e Lancastre (1787—1812), 4th Marquess of Lavradio, 7th Count of Avintes. Succeeded by his brother
 D. António de Almeida Portugal Soares de Alarcão Mello de Castro Ataíde d'Eça Mascarenhas Silva e Lancastre (1794—1874), 5th Marquess of Lavradio, 8th Count of Avintes. Succeeded by his great-grandson
 D. José Maria do Espírito Santo de Almeida Corrêa de Sá (1874—1945), 6th Marquess of Lavradio, 9th Count of Avintes. Succeeded by his son
 D. José Luís de Almeida (1912—1966), 7th Marquess of Lavradio, 11th Count of Avintes, following the premature death of his elder brother António, 10th Count of Avintes, in 1938. Succeeded by his son
 D. Jaime de Almeida, 8th Marquess of Lavradio, 12th Count of Avintes, 6th Count of Torres Vedras.

Coat of Arms 
Notwithstanding their position as heads of various lineages, the Marquesses of Lavradio have traditionally always used the undifferenced arms of Almeida.
 Shield: Gules, a doubled cross Or between six bezants within a bordure of the second.
 Coronet: the shield is surmounted by a ducal coronet, an allusion to the titles of Duke of Aveiro and of Torres Novas.
 Crest: an eagle displayed, Sable, bezanté, armed and beaked Or and langued Gules.
 Motto: Desir de Bien Faire.
The Counts of Avintes use the same arms but for the crest, an eagle Gules rather than Sable.

See also 
 Counts of Avintes
 Counts of Lavradio
 Counts of Torres Vedras

Footnotes

References

External links 
Genealogy of the Marquesses of Lavradio
Portuguese nobility
Portuguese noble families
Margraves of Portugal
1750s establishments in Portugal
1753 establishments in Europe
History of Portugal